Clifton is a historic mansion located at Roslyn Harbor in Nassau County, New York.  The main house is a large, -story, Flemish Revival building constructed about 1863 and altered twice between 1876 and 1932.  It features a complex roof plan, including numerous gables in the forms of cross gables, wall dormers and roof dormers, most of which are Flemish gables with bold molding.  Also on the property are a contributing boathouse and rustic gazebo.

It was listed on the National Register of Historic Places in 1999.

References

Roslyn Harbor, New York
Houses on the National Register of Historic Places in New York (state)
Houses completed in 1863
Houses in Nassau County, New York
National Register of Historic Places in North Hempstead (town), New York